A Daughter Just Like You is a 2015 South Korean television series starring Lee Soo-kyung, Kang Kyung-joon, Kim Hye-ok and Kil Yong-woo. It aired on MBC on Mondays to Fridays at 20:55 for 120 episodes beginning May 18, 2015.

Plot 
Hong Ae-Ja (Kim Hye-Ok) works as a host at a home shopping channel. She has three accomplished daughters: Ji-Sung (Woo Hee-Jin), In-Sung (Lee Soo-Kyung) and Hee-Sung (Jung Hye-Seong). Hong Ae-Ja's family interconnects with So Pan-Seok's (Jung Bo-Suk) family and Heo Eun-Sook's (Park Hae-Mi) as in-laws.

Cast

Hong Ae-ja's family
Kim Hye-ok as Hong Ae-ja
Kil Yong-woo as Ma Jung-ki (Ae-ja's husband)
Woo Hee-jin as Ma Ji-sung (Ae-ja's oldest daughter)
Kim Hye-yoon as young Ma Ji-sung (Ep. 1)
Lee Soo-kyung as Ma In-sung (Ae-ja's second daughter)
Jung Hye-sung as Ma Hee-sung (Ae-ja's youngest daughter)

So Pan-suk's family
Jeong Bo-seok as So Pan-suk
Kang Kyung-joon as So Jung Geun (Pan-suk's eldest son)
Lee Gun-ha as young Jung Geun
Jung Woo-shik as So Seung Geun (Pan-suk's second son)
Jo Woo-ri as So Jung Yi (Pan-suk's youngest daughter)

Huh Eun-sook's family
Park Hae-mi as Huh Eun-sook (Ji-sung's mother-in-law)
Lee Byung-joon as Baek Min-suk (Ji-sung's father-in-law)
Lee Ji-hoon as Baek Woo-jae (Ji-sung's husband)
 Yoon Jong-hoon as Bae Sun Jae

Others
Jun Won-joo as Mal Nyun (Jung-ki's mother)
Kang Sung-min as Kang Hyun Woo
Go Yun-ah as Baek Mi Na (Ji-sung & Woo-jae's daughter)
Han Seung-hyun as Sung Chan
Joey Albright as Dave
Choi Min
Han Yeo-wool
Lee Chang
Kim Seo-kyung
Ahn Byung-kyung
Seo Kwang-jae
 Choi Jung-won as Ahn Jin Bong

References

External links
  

2015 South Korean television series debuts
2015 South Korean television series endings
Korean-language television shows
MBC TV television dramas